Bokovsky District is an administrative and municipal district (raion), one of the forty-three in Rostov Oblast, Russia. It is located in the north of the oblast. Its administrative center is the rural locality (a stanitsa) of Bokovskaya. Population: 15,085 (2010 Census);  The population of Bokovskaya accounts for 32.0% of the district's total population.

References

Notes

Sources

Districts of Rostov Oblast